The 2021–22 Sydney Thunder season was the eleventh in the team's history. Coached by Trevor Bayliss, the Thunder entered BBL11 placing in fourth in BBL10.

Standings

Regular season

Playoffs

Squad information

Each 2021–22 squad is made up of 18 active players. Teams can sign up to five overseas players, with a maximum of three of those being able to play in a matchday.

Personnel changes made ahead of the season included:

 English internationals Alex Hales and Sam Billings opted to re-sign with the Thunder for the season.
 New Zealand international Adam Milne opted not to re-sign with the Thunder for the season.
 English international Saqib Mahmood signed with the Thunder, but will not be available for the start of the tournament due to scheduling
 Callum Ferguson departed the Thunder, with no contract being offered.

The current squad of the Sydney Thunder for the 2021–22 Big Bash League season as of 7 December 2021.

 Players with international caps are listed in bold.

References 

Sydney Thunder seasons
2021–22 Australian cricket season